Hang Lung Bank was a bank in Hong Kong which has since merged into DBS Bank (Hong Kong).

In September 1982, a bank run on Hang Lung Bank began after the collapse of Che Lee Yuen Jewellery & Goldsmith Company and the spread of rumours, but the run subsided on the second day. In September 1983, the level of deposits in the bank fell after adjusting for the valuation effect of the depreciation of the Hong Kong dollar. On 27 September 1983, the Legislative Council passed the "Hang Lung Bank (Acquisition) Ordinance Bill 1983" and the British Hong Kong Government decided to take over the bank. This ensured HK$148 million worth of cheques could be returned to the bank to meet its clearing.

In 1989, the bank was sold to Dao Heng Bank. In 1990, it was merged into Dao Heng Bank. In 2003, Dao Heng Bank, Kwong On Bank and Overseas Trust Bank were merged to form DBS Bank (Hong Kong).

References

Banks disestablished in 1990
1990 disestablishments in Hong Kong
Defunct banks of Hong Kong
DBS Bank